Kaye Anne Starosciak (born Kaye Anne Pappas on April 23, 1973) is an American long-distance runner.

She is regarded as one of the top Masters runners in the United States, competing in the Elite Female Division (Top 50) of the 2014 Boston Marathon and finishing 7th Overall for Female Masters.  Starosciak has won full and half marathons as well as shorter distance races and trail competitions.

Starosciak competed in the 2013 Boston Marathon, finishing approximately one hour before the bombings that forced the race to be stopped.

Career highlights 
 7th, Female Masters Division, 2014 Boston Marathon
 Winner, Female Overall Division, 2015 Publix Georgia Marathon
 Winner, Female Overall Division, 2017 Chickamauga Battlefield Marathon
 Winner, Female Overall Division, 2011 Chickamauga Battlefield Marathon
 Winner, Female Overall Division, 2010 Chickamauga Battlefield Marathon
 Winner, Female Overall Division, 2011 Berry Half Marathon
 Winner, Female Overall Division, 2012 Downhill at Dawn Half Marathon
 Winner, Female Overall Division, 2011 Charlevoix Half Marathon
 Winner, Female Overall Division, 2014 Red Top Rumble Trail Race
 Winner, Female Overall Division, 2013 Red Top Rumble Trail Race
 Winner, Female Masters Division, 2019 Chickamauga Battlefield Marathon
 Winner, Female Masters Division, 2019 Publix Georgia Half Marathon
 Winner, Female Masters Division, 2016 Publix Georgia Marathon
 Winner, Female Masters Division, 2013 Rocket City Marathon
 4th, Female Masters Division, 2014 Detroit Marathon
 3rd, Female Overall Division, 2013 Detroit Half Marathon
 Winner, Female Division, Georgia Games Run for Life 5K, 2011

References

1973 births
American female long-distance runners
Living people
21st-century American women